US Post Office-Bronxville is a historic post office building located at Bronxville in Westchester County, New York, United States. It was built in 1937 and was designed by consulting architect Eric Kebbon (1891–1964) for the Office of the Supervising Architect.  It is a -story building faced with brick and trimmed in limestone in the Colonial Revival style.  The front facade features six extremely flat limestone pilasters that flank the central entrance.  The lobby features a mural by John French Sloan (1871–1951) painted in 1939 and titled The Arrival of the First Mail in Bronxville in 1846.

It was listed on the National Register of Historic Places in 1988.

See also
National Register of Historic Places listings in southern Westchester County, New York

References

Bronxville, New York
Bronxville
Government buildings completed in 1937
Colonial Revival architecture in New York (state)
Buildings and structures in Westchester County, New York
National Register of Historic Places in Westchester County, New York